Hugo Pessanha (born April 1, 1986) is a judoka from Brazil.

See also
History of martial arts
List of judo techniques
List of judoka
Martial arts timeline

References

External links
 

1986 births
Living people
Brazilian male judoka
Place of birth missing (living people)
21st-century Brazilian people
20th-century Brazilian people